Larry Duchesne (born 1949) is a Canadian politician, who was leader of the Prince Edward Island New Democratic Party from 1991 to 1995.

A teacher and former journalist from Kinkora, Prince Edward Island, he won the party leadership on February 3, 1991, over Mike Leclair and Judy Whittaker. He had previously been a candidate for the party in provincial elections in both Prince Edward Island and Nova Scotia.

He led the party into the 1993 election, and was the party's assemblyman candidate in 4th Prince, but won no seats on election day. Following the election loss, he took a three-month unpaid leave of absence from his position as leader, so that he could collect unemployment benefits and thus save the party money through not having to pay his leader's salary.

He resigned as party leader in November 1994, and was succeeded in 1995 by Herb Dickieson.

He ran as the party's candidate in the new district of Parkdale-Belvedere in the 1996 election, but was again not elected to the legislature. In the 1997 federal election, he ran in the district of Cardigan, but did not win the seat.

Duchesne was the Nova Scotia New Democratic Party candidate in Cumberland South for the 2013 Nova Scotia provincial election, but was defeated by Progressive Conservative leader Jamie Baillie. In February 2017, Duchesne was again nominated as Cumberland South's NDP candidate for the next Nova Scotia general election.

Electoral record

References

1949 births
Living people
New Democratic Party of Prince Edward Island leaders
New Democratic Party candidates for the Canadian House of Commons
Nova Scotia New Democratic Party politicians
People from Kinkora, Prince Edward Island
Prince Edward Island candidates for Member of Parliament
Candidates in Nova Scotia provincial elections